"Young temperament" may refer to either of a pair of circulating temperaments described by Thomas Young in a letter dated July 9, 1799, to the Royal Society of London.  The letter was read at the Society's meeting of January 16, 1800, and included in its Philosophical Transactions for that year.   The temperaments are referred to individually as "Young's first temperament" and "Young's second temperament", more briefly as "Young's No. 1" and "Young's  No. 2", or with some other variations of these expressions.

Young argued that there were good reasons for choosing a temperament to make "the harmony most perfect in those keys which are the most frequently used", and presented his first temperament as a way of achieving this.  He gave his second temperament as a method of "very simply" producing "nearly the same effect".

First temperament
The remaining fifths, E-B, B-F, B-F and F-C were all made the same size, chosen so that  the circle of fifths would close—that is, so that the total span of all twelve fifths would be exactly seven octaves. The exact and approximate numerical sizes of the three types of fifth, in cents, are as follows:

Each of the major thirds in the resulting scale comprises four of these fifths less two octaves.  If  sj  fj − 600 ( j = 1, 2, 3 ), the sizes of the major thirds can be conveniently expressed as in the second row of the following table:

As can be seen from the third row of the table, the widths of the tonic major thirds of successive major keys around the circle of fifths increase by about two ( s2 − s1 ,  s3 − s2 ) to four
( s3 − s1 ) cents per step in either direction from the narrowest, in C major, to the widest, in F major.

The following table gives the pitch differences in cents between the notes of a chromatic scale tuned with Young's first temperament and those of one tuned with equal temperament, when the note A of each scale is given the same pitch.

Second temperament

In Young's second temperament, each of the fifths F-C, C-G, G-E,
E-B, B-F,  and F-C are perfectly just, while the fifths C-G, G-D, D-A, A-E, E-B, and B-F are each  of a
Pythagorean (ditonic) comma narrower than just. The exact and approximate numerical sizes of these latter fifths, in cents, are given by:

f4 = 2600 − 1200 log2(3) ≈ 698.04

If  f3  and  s3  are the same as in the previous section, and  s4   f4 − 600 , the sizes of the major thirds in the temperament are as given in the second row of the following table:

The following table gives the pitch differences in cents between the notes of a chromatic scale tuned with Young's second temperament and those of one tuned with equal temperament, when the note A of each scale is given the same pitch.

Young's temperament is shifted one note around the circle of fifths, with the first tempered fifth beginning on C instead of F. For this reason it is sometimes called "Vallotti Young" or "Shifted Vallotti".

Notes

References

Musical temperaments